The Men's 60 meters hurdles event  at the 2009 European Athletics Indoor Championships was held on March 6.

Medalists

Results

Heats
First 3 of each heat (Q) and the next 4 fastest (q) qualified for the semifinals.

Semifinals
First 4 of each semifinals qualified directly (Q) for the final.

Final

References
Results

60 metres hurdles at the European Athletics Indoor Championships
2009 European Athletics Indoor Championships